HLA-B70 (B70) is an HLA-B serotype. The serotype identifies certain B*15 gene-allele protein products of HLA-B. 
B70 is one of many split antigens of the broad antigen, B15.

Serotype

Alleles

References

7